Serkan Çalık (born 15 March 1986) is a Turkish-German former professional footballer who played as a right winger or second striker.

Club career
Çalık was born in Dinslaken, West Germany.

He joined for Galatasaray from Rot-Weiss Essen (2. Bundesliga) in June 2007.

He wore the 61 shirt which is the car number plate location codes for Trabzon, Turkey, where his parents are from. During his days at Galatasaray, he has been used as a right winger by Galatasaray coach Karl Heinz Feldkamp, as he has a very good acceleration and pace.

He signed for Ankara club Gençlerbirliği afterwards in 2010 which was followed by brief spells at Kayseri Erciyesspor and Şanlıurfaspor.

Çalık retired in summer 2019.

International career
Çalik has dual Turkish-German nationality and was eligible for either national team. He made his debut for the Germany U-21 squad in 2007, but switched to the Turkish national team due to better prospects of being called up to the senior side.

Honours
Galatasaray
 Turkish League: 2007–08
 Turkish Super Cup: 2008

References

External links
 
 
 

1986 births
Living people
Association football wingers
Association football forwards
German footballers
Turkish footballers
German people of Turkish descent
Borussia Mönchengladbach players
Rot-Weiss Essen players
Galatasaray S.K. footballers
Gençlerbirliği S.K. footballers
Kayseri Erciyesspor footballers
Şanlıurfaspor footballers
Samsunspor footballers
Yeni Malatyaspor footballers
Sarıyer S.K. footballers
Kırklarelispor footballers
Eyüpspor footballers
Süper Lig players
TFF First League players
TFF Second League players
2. Bundesliga players
Germany under-21 international footballers
Turkey B international footballers